Felipe de Jesús Estévez (born February 5, 1946) is a Cuban-born prelate of the Roman Catholic Church who was bishop of the Diocese of St. Augustine in Florida from 2011 to 2022. Estévez previously served as an auxiliary bishop of the Archdiocese of Miami in Florida from 2003 to 2011.

Biography

Early life 
Felipe Estévez was born in Pedro Betancourt, Cuba on February 6, 1946.  He fled to the United States as a young man under Operation Peter Pan, a program to bring Cuban children to the United States. He is the second of three children (two boys and a girl) of Adriano and Estrella Estevez. Estévez studied at Montreal University in Montreal, Quebec, and received a Licentiate of Theology in 1970.

Priesthood 
Estévez was ordained a priest by Bishop Leo Pursley for the Diocese of Matanzas in Cuba on May 30, 1970 in Fort Wayne, Indiana.  Estévez was sent to Honduras, serving as associate pastor of Guascoran Parish in Guascoran, Honduras for one year.  He became a faculty member in Honduras of the St. Joseph Seminary for one year and Our Lady of Suyapa Seminary for two years.

Returning to the United States in 1975, Estévez joined the faculty at St. Vincent de Paul Regional Seminary in Boynton Beach, Florida, serving there until 1977.  In 1977, he received a Master in Arts degree from Barry University in Miami Shores, Florida.  

Estévez was incardinated, or transferred, into the Archdiocese of Miami on February 9, 1979.  He then went to Rome to study at the Pontifical Gregorian University, receiving  a Doctor of Sacred Theology degree in 1980. Estevez is fluent in Spanish, English, French and Italian. After his return to Florida, he was appointed as president/rector of St. Vincent de Paul, maintaining that role until 1986.

Estévez became the campus minister at Florida International University in Miami, Florida in 1987.  That same year, he was appointed pastor of St. Agatha Parish in Miami . Estévez left both positions in 2001 to become dean of spiritual formation at St. Vincent de Paul.

Auxiliary Bishop of Miami
Estévez was appointed by Pope John Paul II as an auxiliary bishop of the Archdiocese of Miami and titular bishop of Kearney on November 21, 2003. On January 7, 2004, he was consecrated at the Cathedral of St. Mary in Miami by Archbishop John Favalora.  His co-consecrators were Archbishop Pedro Estiu and Bishop Thomas Olmsted.  In 2010, Estévez was appointed as vicar general for the archdiocese.

Bishop of St. Augustine
Pope Benedict XVI appointed Estévez as bishop of the Diocese of St. Augustine to succeed the retiring Bishop Victor Galeone on April 27, 2011.  Estevez was installed at St. Joseph Catholic Church in Mandarin (Jacksonville) Florida. The installation was attended by over 2,000 lay people, deacons, priests, and bishops from around the country and was broadcast on EWTN.

Estévez is an active opponent of the death penalty and abortion rights for women, routinely meeting with legislators, writing policy papers and delivering speeches; he has also been an advocate for the rights of the disabled and immigrants.

Estévez initiated the first ecumenical vespers at the bishop-level in Florida on January 22, 2014, at the Cathedral Basilica of St. Augustine in St. Augustine. The service was attended by Protestant and Orthodox leaders, clergy and lay people.  He attended the installation of Bishop Robert Schaefer of the Evangelical Lutheran Church in America near Tampa, Florida. He collaborated with local Eastern Orthodox Christian leaders in support of the meeting between Pope Francis and Patriarch Bartholomew in Jerusalem on May 25, 2014.

On October 15, 2019, Estévez announced that the Shrine of Our Lady of La Leche, located in the Nombre de Dios mission in St. Augustine, had been designated by the US Conference of Catholic Bishops as a national shrine.

On May 24, 2022, Pope Francis accepted Estévez' resignation as bishop of the Diocese of St. Augustine.

Viewpoints

Immigration 
On June 19, 2019, Estévez said we must show compassion and acknowledge the dignity of undocumented immigrants in the United States and called for reform of the U.S. immigration system.

Capital punishment 

On May 28, 2020, Estévez published a pastoral letter in which he condemned the use of capital punishment in Florida. He stated:We don't want anyone in society to be in danger because of these criminals, but we don't think that death is the answer. Killing them because they have killed would perpetuate the cycle of violence."

Abortion 
On October 11, 2020, just before the 2020 US presidential election, Estévez asked Catholic voters to consider the church's opposition to abortion rights for women when selecting candidates.  He called abortion the "preeminent human rights issue" of our time.

References

External links

 Roman Catholic Diocese of St. Augustine Official Site
 Episcopologio de la Iglesia Católica en Cuba bio
 Bishop Ordained, Gets Ovation; The Miami Herald - January 8, 2004
 The Newest Bishop; The Miami Herald - January 8, 2004
 Roman Catholics Debate Whether Communion Should Be Withheld From Politician -Parishioners - Or Even All Catholics - Whose Views On Abortion Contradict Church Teachings; Miami Herald, The (FL) - May 30, 2004
 Monseñor Estevez Assume Como Obispo Auxiliar; El Nuevo Herald - January 7, 2004

	
 

1946 births
Roman Catholic bishops of Saint Augustine
21st-century Roman Catholic bishops in the United States
Living people
Florida International University people
Roman Catholic Archdiocese of Miami
Cuban emigrants to the United States
People from Matanzas Province
Université de Montréal alumni
Barry University alumni
Pontifical North American College alumni
Pontifical Gregorian University alumni
St. Vincent de Paul Regional Seminary alumni